PUST may refer to:

Pust, the Slovenian name for Carnival
Pust (group), a Norwegian vocal group
Pontifical University of Saint Thomas Aquinas, Rome, Italy
Pyongyang University of Science and Technology, Pyongyang, North Korea
Pabna University of Science and Technology, a university in Bangladesh